Paddy Mullally (born 1976 in Glenmore, Kilkenny) is an Irish sportsperson.  He played hurling with his local club Glenmore and was a member of the Kilkenny senior inter-county team from 1999 until 2004. As of 2010, he was part of the Glenmore management team with responsibility for under-21 hurling.

His brother Tom is a manager. Having previously worked with the Kilkenny and WIT camogie teams and Mullinavat hurling team, Mullally joined his brother as a coach when he took over as manager of the Carlow county hurling team in 2021.

References

1978 births
Living people
All-Ireland Senior Hurling Championship winners
Glenmore hurlers
Hurling coaches
Kilkenny inter-county hurlers